Gabriele Bernardotto (born 22 April 1997) is an Italian professional footballer who plays as a forward for  club Carrarese on loan from Crotone.

Club career
On 18 August 2021, he joined Teramo on loan.

On 1 September 2022, he joined Crotone outright. On 13 January 2023, Bernardotto was loaned by Carrarese.

Career statistics

Club

References

External links 
 
 
 

1997 births
Living people
Footballers from Rome
Italian footballers
Association football forwards
Serie C players
Serie D players
L'Aquila Calcio 1927 players
Lupa Roma F.C. players
U.S. Vibonese Calcio players
U.S. Avellino 1912 players
S.S. Teramo Calcio players
F.C. Crotone players
Carrarese Calcio players